Echeandia reflexa is a species of flowering plant in the family Asparagaceae from south Texas through Mexico to Honduras. It was first described by Antonio José Cavanilles in 1795 as Anthericum reflexum and moved to Echeandia by Joseph Nelson Rose in 1906. It is placed in the subfamily Agavoideae.

References

Agavoideae
Flora of Texas
Flora of Mexico
Flora of Honduras
Plants described in 1795
Taxa named by Antonio José Cavanilles